The 2005 Men's Hockey Africa Cup of Nations was the seventh edition of the Men's Hockey Africa Cup of Nations, the quadrennial international men's field hockey championship of Africa organised by the African Hockey Federation. It was held alongside the women's tournament in Pretoria, South Africa from 1 to 8 October 2005.

The hosts and three-time defending champions South Africa won their fourth title and qualified for the 2006 Men's Hockey World Cup by defeating Egypt 3–2 in penalty strokes in the final. Ghana won the bronze medal by defeating Nigeria 2–0.

Results

Preliminary round

Third place game

Final

Final standings

See also
2005 Women's Hockey Africa Cup of Nations

References

Men's Hockey Africa Cup of Nations
Africa Cup of Nations
Hockey Africa Cup of Nations
Sports competitions in Pretoria
International field hockey competitions hosted by South Africa
Hockey Africa Cup of Nations
Africa Cup of Nations